Teet Kask (born 8 May 1968 in Pärnu) is an Estonian choreographer.

Overview
In 1978, he joined the Tallinn Ballet School, where he studied Vaganova classical ballet.

At 18 years old, he had leading roles in the Estonian National Ballet.

A turning point for Kask came when he was engaged by The Royal Swedish Ballet, in 1989, as the first Estonian ballet artist to work full-time in West before the Iron Curtain fell in 1991.

In 1990, he was invited to work with the Norwegian National Ballet.

In 1997, parallel with dancing, Kask began to work as a freelance choreographer.

In 2005, he graduated from City University London/Trinity Laban Conservatoire of Music and Dance with a Master of Arts in choreography.

Choreographer and director

2014
 Clocks'n'Clouds ballet, The Norwegian National Ballet, Oslo, Norway
 Baan Sirin concert-performance, Bangkok, Thailand
 Grüne Woche opening concert-ceremony director, Berlin, Germany

2013
 Tsar's Bride Rimsky-Korsakov's opera director, PromFest and Kaunas State Musical Theatre
 Big Stage Azerbaijan National TV program director

2012
 Oliver musical for State Opera of Georgia and Rustaveli Theatre, Tbilisi, Georgia
 Eunoto for State Ballet of Georgia, Tbilisi, Georgia
 Motus II for State Ballet of Georgia, Tbilisi, Georgia
 Tampopo for Nina Ananiashvili's 30 Years on Stage Celebration and State Ballet of Georgia, Tbilisi, Georgia

2011
 Exitus for ETA – Estonia Dance Agency, Tallinn, Estonia
 A Wingless Flight Into the Darkness for State Ballet of Georgia, Tbilisi, Georgia
 Father Hunger for STÜ – Independent Dance Union, Tallinn, Estonia

2010
 Joanna tentata Birgitta Festival, Tallinn, Estonia
 The Sound of Water Says What I think Royal Holloway, London, UK

2008
 Consecration of Tallinn Airport, Estonia
 Games On the Grass Nargen Opera, Estonia
 Plough- Shaped Era Pärnu Concert Hall, Estonia

2007
 w.o.r.k. in progress II Tartu, Viljandi, Pärnu, Estonia
 w.o.r.k. in progress I Viljandi, Pärnu, Estonia

2006
 Scope at The Oslo National Academy of the Arts, Norway

2005
 Sad Pleasure at The Place Theatre, London
 Amor Vincit Omnia at Bonnie Bird Theatre, London
 To Fish for Candid Arts Gallery, London

2004
 Female Interfaces at Centre Pompidou, Paris
 Fluxus for the European Art channel Mezzo under European Classics, Paris
 Distant Buddha at The Oslo National Academy of  the Arts, Norway
 Forever at Moscow Youth Theatre, Russia

2003
 Tango for Estonian Drama Company, Tallinn
 Ithaka for David Oistrakh Music Festival in Pärnu, Estonia

2002
 Runo the interval act for Eurovision Song Contest Tallinn, Estonia
 Fluxus for Vanemuine Ballet Company, Tartu, Estonia
 Magic Mountain for Tallinn City Drama Company, Estonia

2001
 Shadowgraph at Black Box Theatre, Oslo
 Peer Gynt for Eurovision Dance Competition, London
 Lighthouse with Estonia National Opera and Ballet Company

2000
 Silent Areas at Hair 2000, Oslo

1999
 Gips for Vigeland Museum with photographer Knut Bry, Oslo
 Dream Sequence for multimedia artist Pia Myrvold, Paris
 Ursula X for Estonian National Ballet, Tallinn

1998
 Duo for Nina Ananiashvili and Bolshoi Stars Japan Tour 1998
 Pling i Bollen for Norwegian food-artist , Henie-Onstad Art Centre, Oslo
 Primum Mobile for Norwegian photographer Knut Bry, Oslo
 Post Machine for Norwegian multimedia artist Pia Myrvold, Oslo

1997
 Veritas Vos Liberabit for The Norwegian National Opera Ballet School, Oslo
 Two at Nille Dance School, Oslo

1996
 Time To ... for The Norwegian National Ballet, Oslo

Ballet companies worked with
 2004, 2014 - Vanemuine Theatre Ballet
 2011–2012 – The State Ballet of Georgia
 1990–2004 – The Norwegian National Ballet
 1989–1990 – The Royal Swedish Ballet
 1986–1989 – The Estonian National Ballet

Producer/artistic consultant
 2009/2010 – artistic consultant for the visual aesthetics, graphics and cultural programme for 30th International Hanseatic Convention (24.-27.06.2010 in Pärnu, Estonia)
 2009/2010 – artistic consultant for the conception developing and planning of 11th Estonian Youth Dance and Song Festival in 2011 for organising team-Eesti Laulu- ja Tantsupeo SA
 2008 – producer of c.o.n.t.est08 - Competition of Nonverbal Theatre in Pärnu, Estonia
 2007 – invited participant of International Festival of Non-Verbal Theatre Personal Profile Moscow, Russia by Moscow Dance Agency TSEH
 2006/2007 – Estonian producer in the international contemporary dance project "The Migrant Body" (Estonia, Italy, the Netherlands, Romania, the UK)
 2005/2006 – artistic director and producer of the White Nights Festival, Estonia
 2002–2004 – consultant for music and dance programs of the Estonian Television (ERR)
 2002 – choreographer and producer of the Interval Act of the Eurolaul 2002
 2001 – founder, producer and director of the production company Motion ArtPro, Norway
 1997–2000 – founder and producer of Stage Fight Courses at Pärnu Endla Theatre, Estonia
 1995 – tour manager of the Swedish dance company "Pullet Proof"

Tutorial work
 2011 – Estonian Dance Agency (ETA, Tallinn, Estonia)
 2009 – Baltic Movement Workshop (Club ZAK Gdansk, Poland)
 2008 – University of Tartu Viljandi Culture Academy, Estonia
 2006 – Tallinn University, Estonia
 2005 - 2006 – White Nights Festival in Pärnu, Estonia
 2002 -  – The Oslo National Academy of the Arts (KHiO), Norway

Awards
1999 – title of "outstanding male dancer" by the Critics Survey of Ballet International/Tanz Aktuell International

Appearances as a dancer
 Man (Babels Barn/Child of Babylon, choreography by Kjersti Alveberg)
 Pair 2 (Holberg Suite, choreography by Ib Andersen)
 White (Monotones, choreography by Sir Frederick Ashton)
 Drosselmayer (Nutcracker, choreography by Dinna Bjørn)
 Tybalt (Romeo and Juliet, choreography by Michael Corder)
 Jean (Miss Julie, choreography by Birgit Cullberg)
 Death (Vier Letzte Lieder, choreography by Rudi van Dantzig)
 Edvard Munch (Between Amor and Psyche, choreography by Anders Døving)
 Rothbart (Swan Lake, choreography by Anna-Marie Holmes)
 Roles in performances: Stoolgame, Heart's Labyrinth, Stamping Ground (choreography by Jiri Kylian)
 Oedipus (Sphinx), Young Husband (La Ronde), Roles in performances: Mythical Hunters, Rite of Spring (choreography by Glen Tetley)
 Demetrius (A Midsummer Night's Dream, choreography by Robert Sund)

References

Further reading
 Tantsijakarjäärist loobunud Teet Kask: pidin nüüd uuesti inimese kombel kõndima õppima | Õhtuleht (In Estonian)
 Koreograaf Teet Kask mõtleb Eestisse naasmisele - Arhiiv - Pärnu Postimees (In Estonian)
 TANTSIJALT HARRASTAJALE: Tantsuguru Teet Kask: Muutke tants, treening, endale tähelepanu andmine ja enda "kuulamine" heaks harjumuseks! - Sport (In Estonian)

1968 births
Living people
Estonian choreographers
Ballet choreographers
Estonian male ballet dancers
People from Pärnu